DNSAP may stand for:

 Danmarks Nationalsocialistiske Arbejderparti - the Danish Nazi party
 Deutsche Nationalsozialistische Arbeiterpartei - an Austrian Pan-Germanic party in the early 20th century
 German National Socialist Workers' Party (Czechoslovakia) - a German far-right nationalist party in Czechoslovakia, 1919–1933

See also
NSDAP